Wongalara Sanctuary is a nature reserve in the Top End of the Northern Territory of Australia.

Location
The sanctuary shares a boundary with Mainoru Station and vacant crown land to the north, Mountain Valley Station to the west, Lonesome Dove and Big River Stations to the south and Urapunga Aboriginal land trust to the south and South-East Arnhem Land Indigenous Protected Area to the east and southeast.

Description
The Mainoru River, Jalbot River and Wilton River all flow through the area. The nearest major road to the sanctuary is the Central Arnhem Road which cuts through neighbouring properties to the north and east.

Landscape
The landscape of Wongalara includes spinifex-covered ranges, sandstone plateaus and escarpments, eucalypt forests and woodlands, patches of monsoon rainforest and wetlands.  The Wilton River flows through the reserve. The dominant vegetation is low open savannah woodland.

Wildlife
Threatened or significant animal species recorded from Wongalara include the northern masked owl, Gouldian finch, crested shrike-tit, hooded parrot, red goshawk, northern quoll, kakadu dunnart and freshwater crocodile.
Scientists come to the sanctuary during the dry season to trap and study mammals and conduct other research projects. By 2013 a  section of the property has been fenced to protect wildlife from feral pests. Feral cattle, buffalo, horses and pigs have all been excluded from the property. These animals all compete with natives for food and destroy the landscape and thin the vegetation. The cost of the  fence is 500,000 with plans to fence the entire property creating the largest feral herbivore-free area in Australia.

See also
List of ranches and stations

References

External links
 Australian Wildlife Conservancy

Nature reserves in the Northern Territory
Australian Wildlife Conservancy reserves
2007 establishments in Australia
Carpentaria tropical savanna